Penny Racers is a racing game for the Nintendo 64. It was released in Japan in 1998 and in North America and Europe in 1999. The game is part of the Japanese racing game series Choro Q and is known by the name Choro Q 64 in Japan. (Japanese title: チョロＱ64). The game had a Nintendo 64 sequel released only in Japan, Choro Q 64 2: Hachamecha Grand Prix Race. It is a customizable racer game, and has a total of 114 parts, arranged in eight categories.

Reception

The game received "mixed" reviews according to the review aggregation website GameRankings. IGN criticized the graphics and sound. Both IGN and GameSpot said that it didn't live up to other racing games on the Nintendo 64 like Mario Kart 64 and Diddy Kong Racing. Nintendo Power found the game's menus hard to navigate. GamePro called it "a cartoony, graphical fender-bender with chunky, featureless cars and cardbord-cutout landscapes." In Japan, Famitsu gave it a score of 25 out of 40.

Notes

References

External links
 

1998 video games
Nintendo 64 games
Nintendo 64-only games
Racing video games
Takara video games
THQ games
Video games developed in Japan
Video games based on Takara Tomy toys